The 1998 DieHard 500 was the ninth stock car race of the 1998 NASCAR Winston Cup Series season and the 29th iteration of the event. The race was held on Sunday, April 26, 1998, in Lincoln, Alabama at Talladega Superspeedway, a 2.66 miles (4.28 km) permanent triangle-shaped superspeedway. The race took the scheduled 188 laps to complete. In the final laps of the race, Joe Gibbs Racing driver Bobby Labonte would make a pass on Terry Labonte with two to go and fend off the field to take his seventh career NASCAR Winston Cup Series victory and his second and final victory of the season. To fill out the podium, Travis Carter Enterprises driver Jimmy Spencer and Robert Yates Racing driver Dale Jarrett would finish second and third, respectively.

Background 

Talladega Superspeedway, originally known as Alabama International Motor Superspeedway (AIMS), is a motorsports complex located north of Talladega, Alabama. It is located on the former Anniston Air Force Base in the small city of Lincoln. The track is a tri-oval and was constructed in the 1960s by the International Speedway Corporation, a business controlled by the France family. Talladega is most known for its steep banking and the unique location of the start/finish line that's located just past the exit to pit road. The track currently hosts the NASCAR series such as the NASCAR Cup Series, Xfinity Series, and Camping World Truck Series. Talladega is the longest NASCAR oval with a length of 2.66-mile-long (4.28 km) tri-oval like the Daytona International Speedway, which also is a 2.5-mile-long (4 km) tri-oval.

Entry list 

 (R) denotes rookie driver.

Practice

First practice 
The first practice session was held on the afternoon of Friday, April 24.

Second practice 
The second practice session was held on the morning of Saturday, April 25.

Final practice 
The final practice session, sometimes referred to as Happy Hour, was held on the afternoon of Saturday, April 25.

Qualifying 
Qualifying was split into two rounds. The first round was held on Friday, April 24, at 3:00 PM CST. Each driver would have one lap to set a time. During the first round, the top 25 drivers in the round would be guaranteed a starting spot in the race. If a driver was not able to guarantee a spot in the first round, they had the option to scrub their time from the first round and try and run a faster lap time in a second round qualifying run, held on Saturday, April 24, at 5:00 PM EST. As with the first round, each driver would have one lap to set a time. On January 24, 1998, NASCAR would announce that the amount of provisionals given would be increased from last season. Positions 26-36 would be decided on time, while positions 37-43 would be based on provisionals. Six spots are awarded by the use of provisionals based on owner's points. The seventh is awarded to a past champion who has not otherwise qualified for the race. If no past champion needs the provisional, the next team in the owner points will be awarded a provisional.

Nine drivers would fail to qualify: Todd Bodine, Jeff Green, Hut Stricklin, Matt Kenseth, Rich Bickle, Dan Pardus, Gary Bradberry, Geoff Bodine, and Bob Strait.

Full qualifying results

Race results

References 

1998 NASCAR Winston Cup Series
NASCAR races at Talladega Superspeedway
April 1998 sports events in the United States
1998 in sports in Alabama